This is a list of Australian bird emblems.

See also
 List of Australian mammal emblems
 List of Australian floral emblems

References

Emblems
Australian Bird